Helbedündorf is a municipality in the district Kyffhäuserkreis, in Thuringia, Germany.

References

Municipalities in Thuringia
Kyffhäuserkreis